Two major trails systems in the USA are named Mid State or Midstate, one in Pennsylvania and one in Massachusetts. 
 Midstate Trail (Massachusetts)
 Mid State Trail (Pennsylvania)